Brant Fell is a hill in the English Lake District, near Bowness-on-Windermere, Cumbria.  It is the subject of a chapter of Wainwright's book The Outlying Fells of Lakeland. It reaches .  Wainwright's route leaves Bowness along the path of the Dales Way, makes an anticlockwise loop over the viewpoint of Post Knott to the summit, and either returns along the Dales Way or follows a woodland path to Helm Road from where another viewpoint, Biskey Howe, is only a slight detour before continuing down Helm Road to Bowness. He commends its "fine prospect of Windermere".

The rocks of the summit are of interest to boulderers.

References

 

Fells of the Lake District